Leonard Kemp (6 June 1909 – 21 January 2009) was an Australian cricketer. He played five first-class cricket matches for Victoria between 1932 and 1934.

See also
 List of Victoria first-class cricketers

References

External links
 

1909 births
2009 deaths
Australian cricketers
Victoria cricketers
Cricketers from Melbourne